Brave: Shaman's Challenge is a puzzle video game by American developer Collision Studios that was planned for release for the Nintendo DS in North America and PAL regions in early 2009. The game is a spin-off of the PlayStation 2 platformer Brave: The Search for Spirit Dancer. Brave, the main character, has to use quick thinking and magic spells to battle Shamans terrorizing him in his dreams. The game was however cancelled.

References

2009 video games
Nintendo DS games
Nintendo DS-only games
SouthPeak Games
Puzzle video games
Video games developed in the United States